Alessandro Geraldini (also Gerardini or Gueraldini) (1455 – March 8, 1524) was a Renaissance humanist scholar at the Spanish court of King Ferdinand and Queen Isabella. He is known for his support of Christopher Columbus.  He served as tutor to the royal children and later accompanied the Infanta Catharine of Aragon to England, as her confessor. He served as Bishop of Vulturara e Montecorvino (1496-1516); and in 1519, at 64 years of age, he traveled to the Spanish settlements in the New World, and became Bishop of Santo Domingo (1516-1524).

Biography 
Geraldini was born in Amelia, in the region of Umbria in Italy. As a young man, he went to Spain, where he served against the Portuguese in 1475/1476. He entered the Church and was entrusted with the education of the princesses of the royal family. While at court, he supported Columbus, who had come to present to the sovereigns of Castile and Aragon his plan for discovering a new road to India and the Far East.
 
In 1496, he was appointed by the King of Spain and confirmed by Pope Alexander VI as Bishop of Vulturara e Montecorvino.
On November 23, 1516, he was nominated by the King of Spain and confirmed by Pope Leo X as Bishop of Santo Domingo and embarked at Seville. Geraldini wrote a great many works on theology, letters, poetry, a biography of Catharine of Aragon, treatises on politics and education, and an important account of his voyage to the Antilles. Geraldini served as Bishop of Santo Domigo until his death on March 8, 1524.

Geraldini attended one of the sessions of the Fifth Council of the Lateran in 1516, likely making him the first cleric from the Western Hemisphere to attend a Roman Catholic Ecumenical Council.

References

External links and additional sources 
 (for Chronology of Bishops) 
 (for Chronology of Bishops) 
 (for Chronology of Bishops) 
 (for Chronology of Bishops)

Further reading 
 

1455 births
1524 deaths
16th-century Italian Roman Catholic bishops
Roman Catholic archbishops of Santo Domingo
People from the Province of Terni
Italian Renaissance humanists
Bishops appointed by Pope Alexander VI
Bishops appointed by Pope Leo X
Household of Catherine of Aragon
Roman Catholic bishops of Santo Domingo